Journal of Turkish Weekly was an English language Turkish news website run by the International Strategic Research Organization, targeted towards policymakers. The journal provided a Turkish approach on global and regional issues. Established in 2004, it is owned by the USAK Derneği, which publishes other printed and online periodicals. It was updated online at least five times daily.

Its website provided free access to the full text of recent articles and book reviews. Topics covered by these include: Turkish politics, relations between Turkey and the European Union; Turkey and terrorism; the Cyprus issue; security issues relating to Armenia; Turkish history; ethnic groups; Islamic fundamentalism; and Turkey.

Major sections 
The online newspaper was organized into three sections:
News, which includes national, world, economy, Balkans, Europe, Middle East and Africa, Central Asia, Caucasus and Americas
Comments, which includes editorials, op-eds and letters to the editor.
Articles, which include English, German, and Turkish articles on Turkey, Central Asia, Russia, Europe, Americas, law, and security

The journal claimed to receive about 350,000 website visits per month.

Columnists 
 Serpil Açıkalın
 Nermin Aydemir
 Alon Ben-Meir
 İhsan Bal
 Haluk Direskeneli
 Çağlar Dölek
 Arzu Celalifer Ekinci
 Çağrı Erhan
 Metin Gezen
 İrem Güney
 Rovshan İbrahimov
 Habibe Kader
 Kamer Kasım
 Imran Khan
 İbrahim Kay
 Havva Kök
 Mustafa Kutlay
 Sedat Laçiner
 Mirzet Mujezinovic
 Mehmet Özcan
 Hasan Selim Özertem
 Güner Özkan
 Sundeep Waslekar
 Barış Sanlı
 Fatma Yılmaz

References

External links
 Official Web site
 About Journal of Turkish Weekly, Intute

Internet properties established in 2004
Turkish news websites